This second government of Luis Muñoz Marín followed his reelection after the enactment of the 1952 Commonwealth Constitution.

Party breakdown 
Party breakdown of cabinet members, not including the governor:

The cabinet was composed of members of the PPD and two independents or technical positions (or people whose membership in a party was not clearly ascertained from any available media).

Members of the Cabinet 
The Puerto Rican Cabinet was led by the Governor alone in this period. The Cabinet was composed of all the Secretaries of the  executive departments of the Commonwealth government, which at this time was limited to a small number of offices as delineated initially in the Constitution.

Notes

References 

Government of Puerto Rico
Governors of Puerto Rico
Members of the Cabinet of Puerto Rico by session
Cabinet of Puerto Rico